Shantilal Purshottamdas Patel (8 April 1938 – 25 May 2011) was an Indian politician from Gujarat. He served as deputy minister in the Ministry of Commerce in Chandra Shekhar cabinet. He was member of Lok Sabha from Godhra in Gujarat, India.

He was elected to 8th, 9th, 11th and 12th Lok Sabha from Godhra.

Positions held 

 1975–1988 Elected as Member, Gujarat Legislative Assembly.
 1977–1988 Vice President, Janata Party Gujrat.
 1988–1989 Member of Parliament, 8th Lok Sabha.
 1989–1991 Member of Parliament, 9th Lok Sabha (2nd term).
 1989–1991 General Secretary, Janata Dal (S).
 1990–1991 Deputy Minister, Commerce Ministry.
 1992 General Secretary, Pradesh Congress Committee (Indira), Gujrat.
 1996–1998 Member of Parliament, 11th Lok Sabha (3rd term).
 1998–1999 Member of Parliament, 12th Lok Sabha (4th term).

Books 

 Panchmahal Darshan.
 Sahakardeep.
 Mahak (biography of Maneklal Gandhi).

References

1938 births
People from Panchmahal district
India MPs 1989–1991
India MPs 1996–1997
India MPs 1998–1999
India MPs 1984–1989
Gujarat politicians
Lok Sabha members from Gujarat
Living people